Ras-related protein Rab-38 is a protein that in humans is encoded by the RAB38 gene.

In melanocytic cells RAB38 gene expression may be regulated by MITF.

References

Further reading